Akalanka (also known as Akalank Deva and Bhatta Akalanka) was a Jain logician whose Sanskrit-language works are seen as landmarks in Indian logic. He lived from 720 to 780 A.D. and belonged to the Digambara sect of Jainism. His work Astasati, a commentary on Aptamimamsa of Acharya Samantabhadra deals mainly with jaina logic. He was a contemporary of Rashtrakuta king Krishna I. He is the author of Tattvārtharājavārtika, a commentary on major Jain text Tattvartha Sutra. He greatly contributed to the development of the philosophy of Anekantavada and is therefore called the "Master of Jain logic".

Life
Akalanka flourished in 750 AD. He was aware of the contents of the Angas, although it cannot be said whether they represent an idea rather than a reality for him, and he also seems to have been the first Digambara to have introduced as a valid form of scriptural classification the division into kalika and utkalika texts which was also employed by the Svetambaras. He is mentioned as a logician and a contemporary of Subhatunga and Rashtrakuta king Krishna I.

The samadhi of Acharya Akalanka is located between  Thurupammor and Karanthai villages, at a distance of 19 km from Kanchipuram, Tamil Nadu.

Works

The following Sanskrit-language works are attributed to Akalanka. Some of these are:

 Laghiyastraya
 Pramānasangraha
 Nyāyaviniscaya-vivarana
 Siddhiviniscaya-vivarana
 Astasati
 Tattvārtharājavārtika

See also 
 Acharya Shri Akalanka Educational Trust
 Karanthai Samadhi of Acharya Akalanka at Thurupammor-Karanthai, Tamil Nadu

Notes

References
 
 
 
 

Digambara
Indian logicians
Indian Jain monks
Jain acharyas
8th-century Indian Jains
8th-century Jain monks
8th-century Indian monks
8th-century Indian mathematicians
8th-century Indian philosophers
720 births
780 deaths
Sanskrit writers